The Journal of Homosexuality is a peer-reviewed academic journal covering research into sexual practices and gender roles in their cultural, historical, interpersonal, and modern social contexts.

History 
The founding editor-in-chief was Charles Silverstein. After the first volume, the journal was edited by John Paul De Cecco who stayed on for about 50 volumes. The current editor-in-chief is John Elia (San Francisco State University). The journal was originally published by the Haworth Press, until it was acquired by Taylor & Francis, who now publish it under their Routledge imprint.

Abstracting and indexing 
The journal is abstracted and indexed in the Social Sciences Citation Index, MEDLINE, Current Contents, PsycINFO, Sociological Abstracts, Social Work Abstracts, Abstracts in Anthropology, Criminal Justice Abstracts, Studies on Women & Gender Abstracts, AgeLine, and Education Research Abstracts. According to the Journal Citation Reports, the journal has a 2015 impact factor of 0.862.

See also 

 List of academic journals in sexology

References

Further reading

External links 
 

Sexology journals
Sexual orientation and science
Sexual orientation and medicine
LGBT-related journals
Taylor & Francis academic journals
Publications established in 1976
English-language journals
Monthly journals